Heavy metals are generally defined as metals with relatively high densities, atomic weights, or atomic numbers. The criteria used, and whether metalloids are included, vary depending on the author and context. In metallurgy, for example, a heavy metal may be defined on the basis of density, whereas in physics the distinguishing criterion might be atomic number, while a chemist would likely be more concerned with chemical behaviour. More specific definitions have been published, but none of these have been widely accepted. The definitions surveyed in this article encompass up to 96 out of the 118 known chemical elements; only mercury, lead and bismuth meet all of them. Despite this lack of agreement, the term (plural or singular) is widely used in science. A density of more than 5 g/cm3 is sometimes quoted as a commonly used criterion and is used in the body of this article.

The earliest known metals—common metals such as iron, copper, and tin, and precious metals such as silver, gold, and platinum—are heavy metals. From 1809 onward, light metals, such as magnesium, aluminium, and titanium, were discovered, as well as less well-known heavy metals including gallium, thallium, and hafnium.

Some heavy metals are either essential nutrients (typically iron, cobalt, and zinc), or relatively harmless (such as ruthenium, silver, and indium), but can be toxic in larger amounts or certain forms. Other heavy metals, such as arsenic, cadmium, mercury, and lead, are highly poisonous. Potential sources of heavy metal poisoning include mining, tailings, smelting, industrial waste, agricultural runoff, occupational exposure, paints and treated timber.

Physical and chemical characterisations of heavy metals need to be treated with caution, as the metals involved are not always consistently defined. As well as being relatively dense, heavy metals tend to be less reactive than lighter metals and have far fewer soluble sulfides and hydroxides. While it is relatively easy to distinguish a heavy metal such as tungsten from a lighter metal such as sodium, a few heavy metals, such as zinc, mercury, and lead, have some of the characteristics of lighter metals, and, lighter metals such as beryllium, scandium, and titanium, have some of the characteristics of heavier metals.

Heavy metals are relatively scarce in the Earth's crust but are present in many aspects of modern life. They are used in, for example, golf clubs, cars, antiseptics, self-cleaning ovens, plastics, solar panels, mobile phones, and particle accelerators.

Definitions

There is no widely agreed criterion-based definition of a heavy metal. Different meanings may be attached to the term, depending on the context. In metallurgy, for example, a heavy metal may be defined on the basis of density, whereas in physics the distinguishing criterion might be atomic number, and a chemist or biologist would likely be more concerned with chemical behaviour.

Density criteria range from above 3.5 g/cm3 to above 7 g/cm3. Atomic weight definitions can range from greater than sodium (atomic weight 22.98); greater than 40 (excluding s- and f-block metals, hence starting with scandium); or more than 200, i.e. from mercury onwards. Atomic numbers of heavy metals are generally given as greater than 20 (calcium); sometimes this is capped at 92 (uranium). Definitions based on atomic number have been criticised for including metals with low densities. For example, rubidium in group (column) 1 of the periodic table has an atomic number of 37 but a density of only 1.532 g/cm3, which is below the threshold figure used by other authors. The same problem may occur with atomic weight based definitions.

The United States Pharmacopeia includes a test for heavy metals that involves precipitating metallic impurities as their coloured sulfides." In 1997, Stephen Hawkes, a chemistry professor writing in the context of fifty years' experience with the term, said it applied to "metals with insoluble sulfides and hydroxides, whose salts produce colored solutions in water and whose complexes are usually colored". On the basis of the metals he had seen referred to as heavy metals, he suggested it would be useful to define them as (in general) all the metals in periodic table columns 3 to 16 that are in row 4 or greater, in other words, the transition metals and post-transition metals. The lanthanides satisfy Hawkes' three-part description; the status of the actinides is not completely settled.

In biochemistry, heavy metals are sometimes defined—on the basis of the Lewis acid (electronic pair acceptor) behaviour of their ions in aqueous solution—as class B and borderline metals. In this scheme, class A metal ions prefer oxygen donors; class B ions prefer nitrogen or sulfur donors; and borderline or ambivalent ions show either class A or B characteristics, depending on the circumstances. Class A metals, which tend to have low electronegativity and form bonds with large ionic character, are the alkali and alkaline earths, aluminium, the group 3 metals, and the lanthanides and actinides. Class B metals, which tend to have higher electronegativity and form bonds with considerable covalent character, are mainly the heavier transition and post-transition metals. Borderline metals largely comprise the lighter transition and post-transition metals (plus arsenic and antimony). The distinction between the class A metals and the other two categories is sharp. A frequently cited proposal to use these classification categories instead of the more evocative name heavy metal has not been widely adopted.

List of heavy metals based on density
A density of more than 5 g/cm3 is sometimes mentioned as a common heavy metal defining factor and, in the absence of a unanimous definition, is used to populate this list and (unless otherwise stated) guide the remainder of the article. Metalloids meeting the applicable criteria–arsenic and antimony for example—are sometimes counted as heavy metals, particularly in environmental chemistry, as is the case here. Selenium (density 4.8 g/cm3) is also included in the list. It falls marginally short of the density criterion and is less commonly recognised as a metalloid but has a waterborne chemistry similar in some respects to that of arsenic and antimony. Other metals sometimes classified or treated as "heavy" metals, such as beryllium (density 1.8 g/cm3), aluminium (2.7 g/cm3), calcium (1.55 g/cm3), and barium (3.6 g/cm3) are here treated as light metals and, in general, are not further considered.

Origins and use of the term
The heaviness of naturally occurring metals such as gold, copper, and iron may have been noticed in prehistory and, in light of their malleability, led to the first attempts to craft metal ornaments, tools, and weapons. All metals discovered from then until 1809 had relatively high densities; their heaviness was regarded as a singularly distinguishing criterion.

From 1809 onwards, light metals such as sodium, potassium, and strontium were isolated. Their low densities challenged conventional wisdom and it was proposed to refer to them as metalloids (meaning "resembling metals in form or appearance"). This suggestion was ignored; the new elements came to be recognised as metals, and the term metalloid was then used to refer to nonmetallic elements and, later, elements that were hard to describe as either metals or nonmetals.

An early use of the term "heavy metal" dates from 1817, when the German chemist Leopold Gmelin divided the elements into nonmetals, light metals, and heavy metals. Light metals had densities of 0.860–5.0 g/cm3; heavy metals 5.308–22.000. The term later became associated with elements of high atomic weight or high atomic number. It is sometimes used interchangeably with the term heavy element. For example, in discussing the history of nuclear chemistry, Magee notes that the actinides were once thought to represent a new heavy element transition group whereas Seaborg and co-workers "favoured ... a heavy metal rare-earth like series ...". In astronomy, however, a heavy element is any element heavier than hydrogen and helium.

Criticism
In 2002, Scottish toxicologist John Duffus reviewed the definitions used over the previous 60 years and concluded they were so diverse as to effectively render the term meaningless. Along with this finding, the heavy metal status of some metals is occasionally challenged on the grounds that they are too light, or are involved in biological processes, or rarely constitute environmental hazards. Examples include scandium (too light); vanadium to zinc (biological processes); and rhodium, indium, and osmium (too rare).

Popularity
Despite its questionable meaning, the term heavy metal appears regularly in scientific literature. A 2010 study found that it had been increasingly used and seemed to have become part of the language of science. It is said to be an acceptable term, given its convenience and familiarity, as long as it is accompanied by a strict definition. The counterparts to the heavy metals, the light metals, are alluded to by The Minerals, Metals and Materials Society as including "aluminium, magnesium, beryllium, titanium, lithium, and other reactive metals."

Biological role

Trace amounts of some heavy metals, mostly in period 4, are required for certain biological processes. These are iron and copper (oxygen and electron transport); cobalt (complex syntheses and cell metabolism); zinc (hydroxylation); vanadium and manganese (enzyme regulation or functioning); chromium (glucose utilisation); nickel (cell growth); arsenic (metabolic growth in some animals and possibly in humans) and selenium (antioxidant functioning and hormone production). Periods 5 and 6 contain fewer essential heavy metals, consistent with the general pattern that heavier elements tend to be less abundant and that scarcer elements are less likely to be nutritionally essential. In period 5, molybdenum is required for the catalysis of redox reactions; cadmium is used by some marine diatoms for the same purpose; and tin may be required for growth in a few species. In period 6, tungsten is required by some archaea and bacteria for metabolic processes. A deficiency of any of these period 4–6 essential heavy metals may increase susceptibility to heavy metal poisoning (conversely, an excess may also have adverse biological effects). An average 70 kg human body is about 0.01% heavy metals (~7 g, equivalent to the weight of two dried peas, with iron at 4 g, zinc at 2.5 g, and lead at 0.12 g comprising the three main constituents), 2% light metals (~1.4 kg, the weight of a bottle of wine) and nearly 98% nonmetals (mostly water).

A few non-essential heavy metals have been observed to have biological effects. Gallium, germanium (a metalloid), indium, and most lanthanides can stimulate metabolism, and titanium promotes growth in plants (though it is not always considered a heavy metal).

Toxicity

Heavy metals are often assumed to be highly toxic or damaging to the environment. Some are, while certain others are toxic only if taken in excess or encountered in certain forms. Inhalation of certain metals, either as fine dust or most commonly as fumes, can also result in a condition called metal fume fever.

Environmental heavy metals
Chromium, arsenic, cadmium, mercury, and lead have the greatest potential to cause harm on account of their extensive use, the toxicity of some of their combined or elemental forms, and their widespread distribution in the environment. Hexavalent chromium, for example, is highly toxic as are mercury vapour and many mercury compounds. These five elements have a strong affinity for sulfur; in the human body they usually bind, via thiol groups (–SH), to enzymes responsible for controlling the speed of metabolic reactions. The resulting sulfur-metal bonds inhibit the proper functioning of the enzymes involved; human health deteriorates, sometimes fatally. Chromium (in its hexavalent form) and arsenic are carcinogens; cadmium causes a degenerative bone disease; and mercury and lead damage the central nervous system.

Lead is the most prevalent heavy metal contaminant. Levels in the aquatic environments of industrialised societies have been estimated to be two to three times those of pre-industrial levels. As a component of tetraethyl lead, it was used extensively in gasoline during the 1930s–1970s. Although the use of leaded gasoline was largely phased out in North America by 1996, soils next to roads built before this time retain high lead concentrations. Later research demonstrated a statistically significant correlation between the usage rate of leaded gasoline and violent crime in the United States; taking into account a 22-year time lag (for the average age of violent criminals), the violent crime curve virtually tracked the lead exposure curve.

Other heavy metals noted for their potentially hazardous nature, usually as toxic environmental pollutants, include manganese (central nervous system damage); cobalt and nickel (carcinogens); copper, zinc, selenium and silver (endocrine disruption, congenital disorders, or general toxic effects in fish, plants, birds, or other aquatic organisms); tin, as organotin (central nervous system damage); antimony (a suspected carcinogen); and thallium (central nervous system damage).

Nutritionally essential heavy metals
Heavy metals essential for life can be toxic if taken in excess; some have notably toxic forms. Vanadium pentoxide (V2O5) is carcinogenic in animals and, when inhaled, causes DNA damage. The purple permanganate ion MnO is a liver and kidney poison. Ingesting more than 0.5 grams of iron can induce cardiac collapse; such overdoses most commonly occur in children and may result in death within 24 hours. Nickel carbonyl (Ni(CO)4), at 30 parts per million, can cause respiratory failure, brain damage and death. Imbibing a gram or more of copper sulfate (CuSO4) can be fatal; survivors may be left with major organ damage. More than five milligrams of selenium is highly toxic; this is roughly ten times the 0.45 milligram recommended maximum daily intake; long-term poisoning can have paralytic effects.

Other heavy metals
A few other non-essential heavy metals have one or more toxic forms. Kidney failure and fatalities have been recorded arising from the ingestion of germanium dietary supplements (~15 to 300 g in total consumed over a period of two months to three years). Exposure to osmium tetroxide (OsO4) may cause permanent eye damage and can lead to respiratory failure and death. Indium salts are toxic if more than few milligrams are ingested and will affect the kidneys, liver, and heart. Cisplatin (PtCl2(NH3)2), which is an important drug used to kill cancer cells, is also a kidney and nerve poison. Bismuth compounds can cause liver damage if taken in excess; insoluble uranium compounds, as well as the dangerous radiation they emit, can cause permanent kidney damage.

Exposure sources
Heavy metals can degrade air, water, and soil quality, and subsequently cause health issues in plants, animals, and people, when they become concentrated as a result of industrial activities. Common sources of heavy metals in this context include mining, smelting and industrial wastes; vehicle emissions; motor oil; fuels used by ships and heavy machineries; construction works; fertilisers; pesticides; paints; dyes and pigments; renovation; illegal depositing of construction and demolition waste; open-top roll-off dumpster; welding, brazing and soldering; glassworking; concrete works; roadworks; use of recycled materials; DIY Metal Projects; burning of joss paper; open burning of waste in rural area; contaminated ventilation system; food contaminated by the environment or by the packaging; armaments; lead–acid batteries; electronic waste recycling yard; and treated timber; aging water supply infrastructure; and microplastics floating in the world's oceans. Recent examples of heavy metal contamination and health risks include the occurrence of Minamata disease, in Japan (1932–1968; lawsuits ongoing as of 2016); the Bento Rodrigues dam disaster in Brazil, high levels of lead in drinking water supplied to the residents of Flint, Michigan, in the north-east of the United States and 2015 Hong Kong heavy metal in drinking water incidents.

Formation, abundance, occurrence, and extraction

Heavy metals up to the vicinity of iron (in the periodic table) are largely made via stellar nucleosynthesis. In this process, lighter elements from hydrogen to silicon undergo successive fusion reactions inside stars, releasing light and heat and forming heavier elements with higher atomic numbers.

Heavier heavy metals are not usually formed this way since fusion reactions involving such nuclei would consume rather than release energy. Rather, they are largely synthesised (from elements with a lower atomic number) by neutron capture, with the two main modes of this repetitive capture being the s-process and the r-process. In the s-process ("s" stands for "slow"), singular captures are separated by years or decades, allowing the less stable nuclei to beta decay, while in the r-process ("rapid"), captures happen faster than nuclei can decay. Therefore, the s-process takes a more or less clear path: for example, stable cadmium-110 nuclei are successively bombarded by free neutrons inside a star until they form cadmium-115 nuclei which are unstable and decay to form indium-115 (which is nearly stable, with a half-life  times the age of the universe). These nuclei capture neutrons and form indium-116, which is unstable, and decays to form tin-116, and so on. In contrast, there is no such path in the r-process. The s-process stops at bismuth due to the short half-lives of the next two elements, polonium and astatine, which decay to bismuth or lead. The r-process is so fast it can skip this zone of instability and go on to create heavier elements such as thorium and uranium.

Heavy metals condense in planets as a result of stellar evolution and destruction processes. Stars lose much of their mass when it is ejected late in their lifetimes, and sometimes thereafter as a result of a neutron star merger, thereby increasing the abundance of elements heavier than helium in the interstellar medium. When gravitational attraction causes this matter to coalesce and collapse, new stars and planets are formed.

The Earth's crust is made of approximately 5% of heavy metals by weight, with iron comprising 95% of this quantity. Light metals (~20%) and nonmetals (~75%) make up the other 95% of the crust. Despite their overall scarcity, heavy metals can become concentrated in economically extractable quantities as a result of mountain building, erosion, or other geological processes.

Heavy metals are found primarily as lithophiles (rock-loving) or chalcophiles (ore-loving). Lithophile heavy metals are mainly f-block elements and the more reactive of the d-block elements. They have a strong affinity for oxygen and mostly exist as relatively low density silicate minerals. Chalcophile heavy metals are mainly the less reactive d-block elements, and period 4–6 p-block metals and metalloids. They are usually found in (insoluble) sulfide minerals. Being denser than the lithophiles, hence sinking lower into the crust at the time of its solidification, the chalcophiles tend to be less abundant than the lithophiles.

In contrast, gold is a siderophile, or iron-loving element. It does not readily form compounds with either oxygen or sulfur. At the time of the Earth's formation, and as the most noble (inert) of metals, gold sank into the core due to its tendency to form high-density metallic alloys. Consequently, it is a relatively rare metal. Some other (less) noble heavy metals—molybdenum, rhenium, the platinum group metals (ruthenium, rhodium, palladium, osmium, iridium, and platinum), germanium, and tin—can be counted as siderophiles but only in terms of their primary occurrence in the Earth (core, mantle and crust), rather the crust. These metals otherwise occur in the crust, in small quantities, chiefly as chalcophiles (less so in their native form).

Concentrations of heavy metals below the crust are generally higher, with most being found in the largely iron-silicon-nickel core. Platinum, for example, comprises approximately 1 part per billion of the crust whereas its concentration in the core is thought to be nearly 6,000 times higher. Recent speculation suggests that uranium (and thorium) in the core may generate a substantial amount of the heat that drives plate tectonics and (ultimately) sustains the Earth's magnetic field.

Broadly speaking, and with some exceptions, lithophile heavy metals can be extracted from their ores by electrical or chemical treatments, while chalcophile heavy metals are obtained by roasting their sulphide ores to yield the corresponding oxides, and then heating these to obtain the raw metals. Radium occurs in quantities too small to be economically mined and is instead obtained from spent nuclear fuels. The chalcophile platinum group metals (PGM) mainly occur in small (mixed) quantities with other chalcophile ores. The ores involved need to be smelted, roasted, and then leached with sulfuric acid to produce a residue of PGM. This is chemically refined to obtain the individual metals in their pure forms. Compared to other metals, PGM are expensive due to their scarcity and high production costs.

Gold, a siderophile, is most commonly recovered by dissolving the ores in which it is found in a cyanide solution. The gold forms a dicyanoaurate(I), for example: 2 Au + H2O +½ O2 + 4 KCN → 2 K[Au(CN)2] + 2 KOH. Zinc is added to the mix and, being more reactive than gold, displaces the gold: 2 K[Au(CN)2] + Zn → K2[Zn(CN)4] + 2 Au. The gold precipitates out of solution as a sludge, and is filtered off and melted.

Properties compared with light metals
Some general physical and chemical properties of light and heavy metals are summarised in the table. The comparison should be treated with caution since the terms light metal and heavy metal are not always consistently defined. Also the physical properties of hardness and tensile strength can vary widely depending on purity, grain size and pre-treatment.

These properties make it relatively easy to distinguish a light metal like sodium from a heavy metal like tungsten, but the differences become less clear at the boundaries. Light structural metals like beryllium, scandium, and titanium have some of the characteristics of heavy metals, such as higher melting points; post-transition heavy metals like zinc, cadmium, and lead have some of the characteristics of light metals, such as being relatively soft, having lower melting points, and forming mainly colourless complexes.

Uses
Heavy metals are present in nearly all aspects of modern life. Iron may be the most common as it accounts for 90% of all refined metals. Platinum may be the most ubiquitous given it is said to be found in, or used to produce, 20% of all consumer goods.

Some common uses of heavy metals depend on the general characteristics of metals such as electrical conductivity and reflectivity or the general characteristics of heavy metals such as density, strength, and durability. Other uses depend on the characteristics of the specific element, such as their biological role as nutrients or poisons or some other specific atomic properties. Examples of such atomic properties include: partly filled d- or f- orbitals (in many of the transition, lanthanide, and actinide heavy metals) that enable the formation of coloured compounds; the capacity of most heavy metal ions (such as platinum, cerium or bismuth) to exist in different oxidation states and therefore act as catalysts; poorly overlapping 3d or 4f orbitals (in iron, cobalt, and nickel, or the lanthanide heavy metals from europium through thulium) that give rise to magnetic effects; and high atomic numbers and electron densities that underpin their nuclear science applications. Typical uses of heavy metals can be broadly grouped into the following six categories.

Weight- or density-based

Some uses of heavy metals, including in sport, mechanical engineering, military ordnance, and nuclear science, take advantage of their relatively high densities. In underwater diving, lead is used as a ballast; in handicap horse racing each horse must carry a specified lead weight, based on factors including past performance, so as to equalize the chances of the various competitors. In golf, tungsten, brass, or copper inserts in fairway clubs and irons lower the centre of gravity of the club making it easier to get the ball into the air; and golf balls with tungsten cores are claimed to have better flight characteristics. In fly fishing, sinking fly lines have a PVC coating embedded with tungsten powder, so that they sink at the required rate. In track and field sport, steel balls used in the hammer throw and shot put events are filled with lead in order to attain the minimum weight required under international rules. Tungsten was used in hammer throw balls at least up to 1980; the minimum size of the ball was increased in 1981 to eliminate the need for what was, at that time, an expensive metal (triple the cost of other hammers) not generally available in all countries. Tungsten hammers were so dense that they penetrated too deeply into the turf.

In mechanical engineering, heavy metals are used for ballast in boats, aeroplanes, and motor vehicles; or in balance weights on wheels and crankshafts, gyroscopes, and propellers, and centrifugal clutches, in situations requiring maximum weight in minimum space (for example in watch movements).

In military ordnance, tungsten or uranium is used in armour plating and armour piercing projectiles, as well as in nuclear weapons to increase efficiency (by reflecting neutrons and momentarily delaying the expansion of reacting materials). In the 1970s, tantalum was found to be more effective than copper in shaped charge and explosively formed anti-armour weapons on account of its higher density, allowing greater force concentration, and better deformability. Less-toxic heavy metals, such as copper, tin, tungsten, and bismuth, and probably manganese (as well as boron, a metalloid), have replaced lead and antimony in the green bullets used by some armies and in some recreational shooting munitions. Doubts have been raised about the safety (or green credentials) of tungsten.

Because denser materials absorb more radioactive emissions than lighter ones, heavy metals are useful for radiation shielding and to focus radiation beams in linear accelerators and radiotherapy applications.

Strength- or durability-based

The strength or durability of heavy metals such as chromium, iron, nickel, copper, zinc, molybdenum, tin, tungsten, and lead, as well as their alloys, makes them useful for the manufacture of artefacts such as tools, machinery, appliances, utensils, pipes, railroad tracks, buildings and bridges, automobiles, locks, furniture, ships, planes, coinage and jewellery. They are also used as alloying additives for enhancing the properties of other metals. Of the two dozen elements that have been used in the world's monetised coinage only two, carbon and aluminium, are not heavy metals. Gold, silver, and platinum are used in jewellery as are (for example) nickel, copper, indium, and cobalt in coloured gold. Low-cost jewellery and children's toys may be made, to a significant degree, of heavy metals such as chromium, nickel, cadmium, or lead.

Copper, zinc, tin, and lead are mechanically weaker metals but have useful corrosion prevention properties. While each of them will react with air, the resulting patinas of either various copper salts, zinc carbonate, tin oxide, or a mixture of lead oxide, carbonate, and sulfate, confer valuable protective properties. Copper and lead are therefore used, for example, as roofing materials; zinc acts as an anti-corrosion agent in galvanised steel; and tin serves a similar purpose on steel cans.

The workability and corrosion resistance of iron and chromium are increased by adding gadolinium; the creep resistance of nickel is improved with the addition of thorium. Tellurium is added to copper (tellurium copper) and steel alloys to improve their machinability; and to lead to make it harder and more acid-resistant.

Biological and chemical
The biocidal effects of some heavy metals have been known since antiquity. Platinum, osmium, copper, ruthenium, and other heavy metals, including arsenic, are used in anti-cancer treatments, or have shown potential. Antimony (anti-protozoal), bismuth (anti-ulcer), gold (anti-arthritic), and iron (anti-malarial) are also important in medicine. Copper, zinc, silver, gold, or mercury are used in antiseptic formulations; small amounts of some heavy metals are used to control algal growth in, for example, cooling towers. Depending on their intended use as fertilisers or biocides, agrochemicals may contain heavy metals such as chromium, cobalt, nickel, copper, zinc, arsenic, cadmium, mercury, or lead.

Selected heavy metals are used as catalysts in fuel processing (rhenium, for example), synthetic rubber and fibre production (bismuth), emission control devices (palladium), and in self-cleaning ovens (where cerium(IV) oxide in the walls of such ovens helps oxidise carbon-based cooking residues). In soap chemistry, heavy metals form insoluble soaps that are used in lubricating greases, paint dryers, and fungicides (apart from lithium, the alkali metals and the ammonium ion form soluble soaps).

Colouring and optics

The colours of glass, ceramic glazes, paints, pigments, and plastics are commonly produced by the inclusion of heavy metals (or their compounds) such as chromium, manganese, cobalt, copper, zinc, selenium, zirconium, molybdenum, silver, tin, praseodymium, neodymium, erbium, tungsten, iridium, gold, lead, or uranium. Tattoo inks may contain heavy metals, such as chromium, cobalt, nickel, and copper. The high reflectivity of some heavy metals is important in the construction of mirrors, including precision astronomical instruments. Headlight reflectors rely on the excellent reflectivity of a thin film of rhodium.

Electronics, magnets, and lighting

Heavy metals or their compounds can be found in electronic components, electrodes, and wiring and solar panels where they may be used as either conductors, semiconductors, or insulators. Molybdenum powder is used in circuit board inks. Ruthenium(IV) oxide coated titanium anodes are used for the industrial production of chlorine. Home electrical systems, for the most part, are wired with copper wire for its good conducting properties. Silver and gold are used in electrical and electronic devices, particularly in contact switches, as a result of their high electrical conductivity and capacity to resist or minimise the formation of impurities on their surfaces. The semiconductors cadmium telluride and gallium arsenide are used to make solar panels. Hafnium oxide, an insulator, is used as a voltage controller in microchips; tantalum oxide, another insulator, is used in capacitors in mobile phones. Heavy metals have been used in batteries for over 200 years, at least since Volta invented his copper and silver voltaic pile in 1800. Promethium, lanthanum, and mercury are further examples found in, respectively, atomic, nickel-metal hydride, and button cell batteries.

Magnets are made of heavy metals such as manganese, iron, cobalt, nickel, niobium, bismuth, praseodymium, neodymium, gadolinium, and dysprosium. Neodymium magnets are the strongest type of permanent magnet commercially available. They are key components of, for example, car door locks, starter motors, fuel pumps, and power windows.

Heavy metals are used in lighting, lasers, and light-emitting diodes (LEDs). Flat panel displays incorporate a thin film of electrically conducting indium tin oxide. Fluorescent lighting relies on mercury vapour for its operation. Ruby lasers generate deep red beams by exciting chromium atoms; the lanthanides are also extensively employed in lasers. Gallium, indium, and arsenic; and copper, iridium, and platinum are used in LEDs (the latter three in organic LEDs).

Nuclear

Niche uses of heavy metals with high atomic numbers occur in diagnostic imaging, electron microscopy, and nuclear science. In diagnostic imaging, heavy metals such as cobalt or tungsten make up the anode materials found in x-ray tubes. In electron microscopy, heavy metals such as lead, gold, palladium, platinum, or uranium are used to make conductive coatings and to introduce electron density into biological specimens by staining, negative staining, or vacuum deposition. In nuclear science, nuclei of heavy metals such as chromium, iron, or zinc are sometimes fired at other heavy metal targets to produce superheavy elements; heavy metals are also employed as spallation targets for the production of neutrons or radioisotopes such as astatine (using lead, bismuth, thorium, or uranium in the latter case).

Notes

Sources

Citations

References

 Ahrland S., Liljenzin J. O. & Rydberg J. 1973, "Solution chemistry," in J. C. Bailar & A. F. Trotman-Dickenson (eds), Comprehensive Inorganic Chemistry, vol. 5, The Actinides, Pergamon Press, Oxford.
 Albutt M. & Dell R. 1963, The nitrites and sulphides of uranium, thorium and plutonium: A review of present knowledge, UK Atomic Energy Authority Research Group, Harwell, Berkshire.
 Alves A. K., Berutti, F. A. & Sánche, F. A. L. 2012, "Nanomaterials and catalysis", in C. P. Bergmann & M. J. de Andrade (ads), Nanonstructured Materials for Engineering Applications, Springer-Verlag, Berlin, .
 Amasawa E., Yi Teah H., Yu Ting Khew, J., Ikeda I. & Onuki M. 2016, "Drawing Lessons from the Minamata Incident for the General Public: Exercise on Resilience, Minamata Unit AY2014", in M. Esteban, T. Akiyama, C. Chen, I. Ikea, T. Mino (eds), Sustainability Science: Field Methods and Exercises, Springer International, Switzerland, pp. 93–116,  .
 Ariel E., Barta J. & Brandon D. 1973, "Preparation and properties of heavy metals", Powder Metallurgy International, vol. 5, no. 3, pp. 126–129.
 Atlas R. M. 1986, Basic and Practical Microbiology, Macmillan Publishing Company, New York, .
 Australian Government 2016, National Pollutant Inventory, Department of the Environment and Energy, accessed 16 August 2016.
 Baird C. & Cann M. 2012, Environmental Chemistry, 5th ed., W. H. Freeman and Company, New York, .
 Baldwin D. R. & Marshall W. J. 1999, "Heavy metal poisoning and its laboratory investigation", Annals of Clinical Biochemistry, vol. 36, no. 3, pp. 267–300, .
 Ball J. L., Moore A. D. & Turner S. 2008, Ball and Moore's Essential Physics for Radiographers, 4th ed., Blackwell Publishing, Chichester, .
 Bánfalvi G. 2011, "Heavy metals, trace elements and their cellular effects", in G. Bánfalvi (ed.), Cellular Effects of Heavy Metals, Springer, Dordrecht, pp.  3–28, .
 Baranoff E. 2015, "First-row transition metal complexes for the conversion of light into electricity and electricity into light", in W-Y Wong (ed.), Organometallics and Related Molecules for Energy Conversion, Springer, Heidelberg, pp. 61–90, .
 Berea E., Rodriguez-lbelo M. & Navarro J. A. R. 2016, "Platinum Group Metal—Organic frameworks" in S. Kaskel (ed.), The Chemistry of Metal-Organic Frameworks: Synthesis, Characterisation, and Applications, vol. 2, Wiley-VCH Weinheim, pp. 203–230, .
 Berger A. J. & Bruning N. 1979, Lady Luck's Companion: How to Play ... How to Enjoy ... How to Bet ... How to Win, Harper & Row, New York, .
 Berry L. G. & Mason B. 1959, Mineralogy: Concepts, Descriptions, Determinations, W. H. Freeman and Company, San Francisco.
 Biddle H. C. & Bush G. L 1949, Chemistry Today, Rand McNally, Chicago.
 Bonchev D. & Kamenska V. 1981, "Predicting the properties of the 113–120 transactinide elements", The Journal of Physical Chemistry, vo. 85, no. 9, pp. 1177–1186, .
 Bonetti A., Leone R., Muggia F. & Howell S. B. (eds) 2009, Platinum and Other Heavy Metal Compounds in Cancer Chemotherapy: Molecular Mechanisms and Clinical Applications, Humana Press, New York, .
 Booth H. S. 1957, Inorganic Syntheses, vol. 5, McGraw-Hill, New York.
 Bradl H. E. 2005, "Sources and origins of heavy metals", in Bradl H. E. (ed.), Heavy Metals in the Environment: Origin, Interaction and Remediation, Elsevier, Amsterdam, .
 Brady J. E. & Holum J. R. 1995, Chemistry: The Study of Matter and its Changes, 2nd ed., John Wiley & Sons, New York, .
 Brephohl E. & McCreight T. (ed) 2001, The Theory and Practice of Goldsmithing, C. Lewton-Brain trans., Brynmorgen Press, Portland, Maine, .
 Brown I. 1987, "Astatine: Its organonuclear chemistry and biomedical applications," in H. J. Emeléus & A. G. Sharpe (eds), Advances in Inorganic Chemistry, vol. 31, Academic Press, Orlando, pp. 43–88, .
 Bryson R. M. & Hammond C. 2005, "Generic methodologies for nanotechnology: Characterisation"', in R. Kelsall, I. W. Hamley & M. Geoghegan, Nanoscale Science and Technology, John Wiley & Sons, Chichester, pp. 56–129, .
 Burkett B. 2010, Sport Mechanics for Coaches, 3rd ed., Human Kinetics, Champaign, Illinois, .
 Casey C. 1993, "Restructuring work: New work and new workers in post-industrial production", in R. P. Coulter & I. F. Goodson (eds), Rethinking Vocationalism: Whose Work/life is it?, Our Schools/Our Selves Education Foundation, Toronto, .
 Chakhmouradian A.R., Smith M. P. & Kynicky J. 2015, "From "strategic" tungsten to "green" neodymium: A century of critical metals at a glance", Ore Geology Reviews, vol. 64, January, pp. 455–458, .
 Chambers E. 1743, "Metal", in Cyclopedia: Or an Universal Dictionary of Arts and Sciences (etc.), vol. 2, D. Midwinter, London.
 Chandler D. E. & Roberson R. W. 2009, Bioimaging: Current Concepts in Light & Electron Microscopy, Jones & Bartlett Publishers, Boston, .
 Chawla N. & Chawla K. K. 2013, Metal matrix composites, 2nd ed., Springer Science+Business Media, New York, .
 Chen J. & Huang K. 2006, "A new technique for extraction of platinum group metals by pressure cyanidation", Hydrometallurgy, vol. 82, nos. 3–4, pp. 164–171, .
 Choptuik M. W., Lehner L. & Pretorias F. 2015, "Probing strong-field gravity through numerical simulation", in A. Ashtekar, B. K. Berger, J. Isenberg & M. MacCallum (eds), General Relativity and Gravitation: A Centennial Perspective, Cambridge University Press, Cambridge, .
 Clegg B 2014, "Osmium tetroxide", Chemistry World, accessed 2 September 2016.
 Close F. 2015, Nuclear Physics: A Very Short Introduction, Oxford University Press, Oxford, .
 Clugston M & Flemming R 2000, Advanced Chemistry, Oxford University, Oxford, .
 Cole M., Lindeque P., Halsband C. & Galloway T. S. 2011, "Microplastics as contaminants in the marine environment: A review", Marine Pollution Bulletin, vol. 62, no. 12, pp. 2588–2597, .
 Cole S. E. & Stuart K. R. 2000, "Nuclear and cortical histology for brightfield microscopy", in D. J. Asai & J. D. Forney (eds), Methods in Cell Biology, vol. 62, Academic Press, San Diego, pp. 313–322, .
 Cotton S. A. 1997, Chemistry of Precious Metals, Blackie Academic & Professional, London, .
 Cotton S. 2006, Lanthanide and Actinide Chemistry, reprinted with corrections 2007, John Wiley & Sons, Chichester, .
 Cox P. A. 1997, The elements: Their Origin, Abundance and Distribution, Oxford University Press, Oxford, .
 Crundwell F. K., Moats M. S., Ramachandran V., Robinson T. G. & Davenport W. G. 2011, Extractive Metallurgy of Nickel, Cobalt and Platinum Group Metals, Elsevier, Kidlington, Oxford, .
 Cui X-Y., Li S-W., Zhang S-J., Fan Y-Y., Ma L. Q. 2015, "Toxic metals in children's toys and jewelry: Coupling bioaccessibility with risk assessment", Environmental Pollution, vol. 200, pp. 77–84, .
 Dapena J. & Teves M. A. 1982, "Influence of the diameter of the hammer head on the distance of a hammer throw", Research Quarterly for Exercise and Sport, vol. 53, no. 1, pp. 78–81, .
 De Zuane J. 1997, Handbook of Drinking Water Quality, 2nd ed., John Wiley & Sons, New York, .
 Department of the Navy 2009, Gulf of Alaska Navy Training Activities: Draft Environmental Impact Statement/Overseas Environmental Impact Statement, U.S. Government, accessed 21 August 2016.
 Deschlag J. O. 2011, "Nuclear fission", in A. Vértes, S. Nagy, Z. Klencsár, R. G. Lovas, F. Rösch (eds), Handbook of Nuclear Chemistry, 2nd ed., Springer Science+Business Media, Dordrecht, pp. 223–280, .
 Desoize B. 2004, "Metals and metal compounds in cancer treatment", Anticancer Research, vol. 24, no. 3a, pp. 1529–1544, .
 Dev N. 2008, 'Modelling Selenium Fate and Transport in Great Salt Lake Wetlands', PhD dissertation, University of Utah, ProQuest, Ann Arbor, Michigan, .
 Di Maio V. J. M. 2001, Forensic Pathology, 2nd ed., CRC Press, Boca Raton, .
 Di Maio V. J. M. 2016, Gunshot Wounds: Practical Aspects of Firearms, Ballistics, and Forensic Techniques, 3rd ed., CRC Press, Boca Raton, Florida, .
 Duffus J. H. 2002, " 'Heavy metals'—A meaningless term?", Pure and Applied Chemistry, vol. 74, no. 5, pp. 793–807, .
 Dunn P. 2009, Unusual metals could forge new cancer drugs, University of Warwick, accessed 23 March 2016.
 Ebbing D. D. & Gammon S. D. 2017, General Chemistry, 11th ed., Cengage Learning, Boston, .
 Edelstein N. M., Fuger J., Katz J. L. & Morss L. R. 2010, "Summary and comparison of properties of the actinde and transactinide elements," in L. R. Morss, N. M. Edelstein & J. Fuger (eds), The Chemistry of the Actinide and Transactinide Elements, 4th ed., vol. 1–6, Springer, Dordrecht, pp. 1753–1835, .
 Eisler R. 1993, Zinc Hazards to Fish, Wildlife, and Invertebrates: A Synoptic Review, Biological Report 10, U. S. Department of the Interior, Laurel, Maryland, accessed 2 September 2016.
 Elliott S. B. 1946, The Alkaline-earth and Heavy-metal Soaps,  Reinhold Publishing Corporation, New York.
 Emsley J. 2011, Nature's Building Blocks, new edition, Oxford University Press, Oxford, .
 Everts S. 2016, "What chemicals are in your tattoo", Chemical & Engineering News, vol. 94, no. 33, pp. 24–26.
 Fournier J. 1976, "Bonding and the electronic structure of the actinide metals," Journal of Physics and Chemistry of Solids, vol 37, no. 2, pp. 235–244, .
 Frick J. P. (ed.) 2000, Woldman's Engineering Alloys, 9th ed., ASM International, Materials Park, Ohio, .
 Frommer H. H. & Stabulas-Savage J. J. 2014, Radiology for the Dental Professional, 9th ed., Mosby Inc., St. Louis, Missouri, .
*Gidding J. C. 1973, Chemistry, Man, and Environmental Change: An Integrated Approach, Canfield Press, New York, .
 Gmelin L. 1849, Hand-book of chemistry, vol. III, Metals, translated from the German by H. Watts, Cavendish Society, London.
 Goldsmith R. H. 1982, "Metalloids", Journal of Chemical Education, vol. 59, no. 6, pp. 526–527, .
 Gorbachev V. M., Zamyatnin Y. S. & Lbov A. A. 1980, Nuclear Reactions in Heavy Elements: A Data Handbook, Pergamon Press, Oxford, .
 Gordh G. & Headrick D. 2003, A Dictionary of Entomology, CABI Publishing, Wallingford, .
 Greenberg B. R. & Patterson D. 2008, Art in Chemistry; Chemistry in Art, 2nd ed., Teachers Ideas Press, Westport, Connecticut, .
 Gribbon J. 2016, 13.8: The Quest to Find the True Age of the Universe and the Theory of Everything, Yale University Press, New Haven, .
 Gschneidner Jr., K. A. 1975, Inorganic compounds, in C. T. Horowitz (ed.), Scandium: Its Occurrence, Chemistry, Physics, Metallurgy, Biology and Technology, Academic Press, London, pp. 152–251, .
 Guandalini G. S., Zhang L., Fornero E., Centeno J. A., Mokashi V. P., Ortiz P. A., Stockelman M. D., Osterburg A. R. & Chapman G. G. 2011, "Tissue distribution of tungsten in mice following oral exposure to sodium tungstate," Chemical Research in Toxicology, vol. 24, no. 4, pp 488–493, .
 Guney M. & Zagury G. J. 2012, "Heavy metals in toys and low-cost jewelry: Critical review of U.S. and Canadian legislations and recommendations for testing", Environmental Science & Technology, vol. 48, pp. 1238–1246, .
 Habashi F. 2009, "Gmelin and his Handbuch", Bulletin for the History of Chemistry, vol. 34, no. 1, pp. 30–1.
 Hadhazy A. 2016, "Galactic 'gold mine' explains the origin of nature's heaviest elements", Science Spotlights, 10 May 2016, accessed 11 July 2016.
 Hartmann W. K. 2005, Moons & Planets, 5th ed., Thomson Brooks/Cole, Belmont, California, .
 Harvey P. J., Handley H. K. & Taylor M. P. 2015, "Identification of the sources of metal (lead) contamination in drinking waters in north-eastern Tasmania using lead isotopic compositions," Environmental Science and Pollution Research, vol. 22, no. 16, pp. 12276–12288,  .
 Hasan S. E. 1996, Geology and Hazardous Waste Management, Prentice Hall, Upper Saddle River, New Jersey, .
 Hawkes S. J. 1997, "What is a "heavy metal"?", Journal of Chemical Education, vol. 74, no. 11, p. 1374, .
 Haynes W. M. 2015, CRC Handbook of Chemistry and Physics, 96th ed., CRC Press, Boca Raton, Florida, .
 Hendrickson D. J. 2916, "Effects of early experience on brain and body", in D. Alicata, N. N. Jacobs, A. Guerrero and M. Piasecki (eds), Problem-based Behavioural Science and Psychiatry 2nd ed., Springer, Cham, pp. 33–54, .
 Hermann A., Hoffmann R. & Ashcroft N. W. 2013, "Condensed astatine: Monatomic and metallic", Physical Review Letters, vol. 111, pp. 11604–1−11604-5, .
 Herron N. 2000, "Cadmium compounds," in Kirk-Othmer Encyclopedia of Chemical Technology, vol. 4, John Wiley & Sons, New York, pp. 507–523, .
 Hoffman D. C., Lee D. M. & Pershina V. 2011, "Transactinide elements and future elements," in L. R. Morss, N. Edelstein, J. Fuger & J. J. Katz (eds), The Chemistry of the Actinide and Transactinide Elements, 4th ed., vol. 3, Springer, Dordrecht, pp. 1652–1752, .
 Hofmann S. 2002, On Beyond Uranium: Journey to the End of the Periodic Table, Taylor & Francis, London, .
 Housecroft J. E. 2008, Inorganic Chemistry, Elsevier, Burlington, Massachusetts, .
 Howell N., Lavers J., Paterson D., Garrett R. & Banati R. 2012, Trace metal distribution in feathers from migratory, pelagic birds, Australian Nuclear Science and Technology Organisation, accessed 3 May 2014.
 Hübner R., Astin K. B. & Herbert R. J. H. 2010, " 'Heavy metal'—time to move on from semantics to pragmatics?", Journal of Environmental Monitoring, vol. 12, pp. 1511–1514, .
 Ikehata K., Jin Y., Maleky N. & Lin A. 2015, "Heavy metal pollution in water resources in China—Occurrence and public health implications", in S. K. Sharma (ed.), Heavy Metals in Water: Presence, Removal and Safety, Royal Society of Chemistry, Cambridge, pp. 141–167, .
 International Antimony Association 2016, Antimony compounds, accessed 2 September 2016.
 International Platinum Group Metals Association n.d., The Primary Production of Platinum Group Metals (PGMs), accessed 4 September 2016.
 Ismail A. F., Khulbe K. & Matsuura T. 2015, Gas Separation Membranes: Polymeric and Inorganic, Springer, Cham, Switzerland, .
 IUPAC 2016, "IUPAC is naming the four new elements nihonium, moscovium, tennessine, and oganesson" accessed 27 August 2016.
 Iyengar G. V. 1998, "Reevaluation of the trace element content in Reference Man", Radiation Physics and Chemistry, vol. 51, nos 4–6, pp. 545–560, 
 Jackson J. & Summitt J. 2006, The Modern Guide to Golf Clubmaking: The Principles and Techniques of Component Golf Club Assembly and Alteration, 5th ed., Hireko Trading Company, City of Industry, California, .
 Järup L 2003, "Hazards of heavy metal contamination", British Medical Bulletin, vol. 68, no. 1, pp. 167–182, .
 Jones C. J. 2001, d- and f-Block Chemistry, Royal Society of Chemistry, Cambridge, .
 Kantra S. 2001, "What's new", Popular Science, vol. 254, no. 4, April, p. 10.
 Keller C., Wolf W. & Shani J. 2012, "Radionuclides, 2. Radioactive elements and artificial radionuclides", in F. Ullmann (ed.), Ullmann's Encyclopedia of Industrial Chemistry, vol. 31, Wiley-VCH, Weinheim, pp. 89–117, .
 King R. B. 1995, Inorganic Chemistry of Main Group Elements, Wiley-VCH, New York, .
 Kolthoff I. M. & Elving P. J. FR 1964, Treatise on Analytical Chemistry, part II, vol. 6, Interscience Encyclopedia, New York, .
 Korenman I. M. 1959, "Regularities in properties of thallium", Journal of General Chemistry of the USSR, English translation, Consultants Bureau, New York, vol. 29, no. 2, pp. 1366–90, .
 Kozin L. F. & Hansen S. C. 2013, Mercury Handbook: Chemistry, Applications and Environmental Impact, RSC Publishing, Cambridge, .
 Kumar R., Srivastava P. K., Srivastava S. P. 1994, "Leaching of heavy metals (Cr, Fe, and Ni) from stainless steel utensils in food simulates and food materials", Bulletin of Environmental Contamination and Toxicology, vol. 53, no. 2, pp. 259–266.
 Lach K., Steer B., Gorbunov B., Mička V. & Muir R. B. 2015, "Evaluation of exposure to airborne heavy metals at gun shooting ranges", The Annals of Occupational Hygiene, vol. 59, no. 3, pp. 307–323, .
 Landis W., Sofield R. & Yu M-H. 2010, Introduction to Environmental Toxicology: Molecular Substructures to Ecological Landscapes, 4th ed., CRC Press, Boca Raton, Florida, .
 Lane T. W., Saito M. A., George G. N., Pickering, I. J., Prince R. C. & Morel F. M. M. 2005, "Biochemistry: A cadmium enzyme from a marine diatom", Nature, vol. 435, no. 7038, p. 42, .
 Lee J. D. 1996, Concise Inorganic Chemistry, 5th ed., Blackwell Science, Oxford, .
 Leeper G. W. 1978, Managing the Heavy Metals on the Land Marcel Dekker, New York, .
 Lemly A. D. 1997, "A teratogenic deformity index for evaluating impacts of selenium on fish populations", Ecotoxicology and Environmental Safety, vol. 37, no. 3, pp. 259–266, .
 Lide D. R. (ed.) 2004, CRC Handbook of Chemistry and Physics, 85th ed., CRC Press, Boca Raton, Florida, .
 Liens J. 2010, "Heavy metals as pollutants", in B. Warf (ed.), Encyclopaedia of Geography, Sage Publications, Thousand Oaks, California, pp. 1415–1418, .
 Lima E., Guerra R., Lara V. & Guzmán A. 2013, "Gold nanoparticles as efficient antimicrobial agents for Escherichia coli and Salmonella typhi " Chemistry Central, vol. 7:11,   .
 Litasov K. D. & Shatskiy A. F. 2016, "Composition of the Earth's core: A review", Russian Geology and Geophysics, vol. 57, no. 1, pp. 22–46, .
 Livesey A. 2012, Advanced Motorsport Engineering, Routledge, London, .
 Livingston R. A. 1991, "Influence of the Environment on the Patina of the Statue of Liberty", Environmental Science & Technology, vol. 25, no. 8, pp. 1400–1408, .
 Longo F. R. 1974, General Chemistry: Interaction of Matter, Energy, and Man, McGraw-Hill, New York, .
 Love M. 1998, Phasing Out Lead from Gasoline: Worldwide Experience and Policy Implications, World Bank Technical Paper volume 397, The World Bank, Washington DC, .
 Lyman W. J. 1995, "Transport and transformation processes", in Fundamentals of Aquatic Toxicology, G. M. Rand (ed.), Taylor & Francis, London, pp. 449–492, .
 Macintyre J. E. 1994, Dictionary of inorganic compounds, supplement 2, Dictionary of Inorganic Compounds, vol. 7, Chapman & Hall, London, .
 MacKay K. M., MacKay R. A. & Henderson W. 2002, Introduction to Modern Inorganic Chemistry, 6th ed., Nelson Thornes, Cheltenham, .
 Magee R. J. 1969, Steps to Atomic Power, Cheshire for La Trobe University, Melbourne.
 Magill F. N. I (ed.) 1992, Magill's Survey of Science, Physical Science series, vol. 3, Salem Press, Pasadena, .
 Martin M. H. & Coughtrey P. J. 1982, Biological Monitoring of Heavy Metal Pollution, Applied Science Publishers, London, .
 Massarani M. 2015, "Brazilian mine disaster releases dangerous metals," Chemistry World, November 2015, accessed 16 April 2016.
 Masters C. 1981, Homogenous Transition-metal Catalysis: A Gentle Art, Chapman and Hall, London, .
 Matyi R. J. & Baboian R. 1986, "An X-ray Diffraction Analysis of the Patina of the Statue of Liberty", Powder Diffraction, vol. 1, no. 4, pp. 299–304, .
 McColm I. J. 1994, Dictionary of Ceramic Science and Engineering, 2nd ed., Springer Science+Business Media, New York, .
 McCurdy R. M. 1975, Qualities and quantities: Preparation for College Chemistry, Harcourt Brace Jovanovich, New York, .
 McLemore V. T. (ed.) 2008, Basics of Metal Mining Influenced Water, vol. 1, Society for Mining, Metallurgy, and Exploration, Littleton, Colorado, .
 McQueen K. G. 2009, Regolith geochemistry, in K. M. Scott & C. F. Pain (eds), Regolith Science, CSIRO Publishing, Collingwood, Victoria, .
 Mellor J. W. 1924, A comprehensive Treatise on Inorganic and Theoretical Chemistry, vol. 5, Longmans, Green and Company, London.
 Moore J. W. & Ramamoorthy S. 1984, Heavy Metals in Natural Waters: Applied Monitoring and Impact Assessment, Springer Verlag, New York, .
 Morris C. G. 1992, Academic Press Dictionary of Science and Technology, Harcourt Brace Jovanovich, San Diego, .
 Morstein J. H. 2005, "Fat Man", in E. A. Croddy & Y. Y. Wirtz (eds), Weapons of Mass Destruction: An Encyclopedia of Worldwide Policy, Technology, and History, ABC-CLIO, Santa Barbara, California, .
 Moselle B. (ed.) 2005, 2004 National Home Improvement Estimator, Craftsman Book Company, Carlsbad, California, .
 Naja G. M. & Volesky B. 2009, "Toxicity and sources of Pb, Cd, Hg, Cr, As, and radionuclides", in L. K. Wang, J. P. Chen, Y. Hung & N. K. Shammas, Heavy Metals in the Environment, CRC Press, Boca Raton, Florida, .
 Nakbanpote W., Meesungneon O. & Prasad M. N. V. 2016, "Potential of ornamental plants for phytoremediation of heavy metals and income generation", in M. N. V. Prasad (ed.), Bioremediation and Bioeconomy, Elsevier, Amsterdam, pp. 179–218, .
 Nathans M. W. 1963, Elementary Chemistry, Prentice Hall, Englewood Cliffs, New Jersey.
 National Materials Advisory Board 1971, Trends in the Use of Depleted Uranium, National Academy of Sciences – National Academy of Engineering, Washington DC.
 National Materials Advisory Board 1973, Trends in Usage of Tungsten, National Academy of Sciences – National Academy of Engineering, Washington DC.
 National Organization for Rare Disorders 2015, Heavy metal poisoning, accessed 3 March 2016.
 Natural Resources Canada 2015, "Generation of the Earth's magnetic field", accessed 30 August 2016.
 Nieboer E. & Richardson D. 1978, "Lichens and 'heavy metals' ", International Lichenology Newsletter, vol. 11, no. 1, pp. 1–3.
 Nieboer E. & Richardson D. H. S. 1980, "The replacement of the nondescript term 'heavy metals' by a biologically and chemically significant classification of metal ions", Environmental Pollution Series B, Chemical and Physical, vol. 1, no. 1, pp. 3–26, .
 Nzierżanowski K. & Gawroński S. W. 2012, "Heavy metal concentration in plants growing on the vicinity of railroad tracks: a pilot study", Challenges of Modern Technology, vol. 3, no. 1, pp. 42–45, accessed 21 August 2016.
 Ohlendorf H. M. 2003, "Ecotoxicology of selenium", in D. J. Hoffman, B. A. Rattner, G. A. Burton & J. Cairns, Handbook of Ecotoxicology, 2nd ed., Lewis Publishers, Boca Raton, pp. 466–491, .
 Ondreička R., Kortus J. & Ginter E. 1971, "Aluminium, its absorption, distribution, and effects on phosphorus metabolism", in S. C. Skoryna & D. Waldron-Edward (eds), Intestinal Absorption of Metal Ions, Trace Elements and Radionuclides, Pergamon press, Oxford.
 Ong K. L., Tan T. H. & Cheung W. L. 1997, "Potassium permanganate poisoning—a rare cause of fatal poisoning", Journal of Accident & Emergency Medicine, vol. 14, no. 1, pp. 43–45, .
 Oxford English Dictionary 1989, 2nd ed., Oxford University Press, Oxford, .
 Pacheco-Torgal F., Jalali S. & Fucic A. (eds) 2012, Toxicity of building materials, Woodhead Publishing, Oxford, .
 Padmanabhan T. 2001, Theoretical Astrophysics, vol. 2, Stars and Stellar Systems, Cambridge University Press, Cambridge, .
 Pan W. & Dai J. 2015, "ADS based on linear accelerators", in W. Chao & W. Chou (eds), Reviews of accelerator science and technology, vol. 8, Accelerator Applications in Energy and Security, World Scientific, Singapore, pp. 55–76, .
 Parish R. V. 1977, The Metallic Elements, Longman, New York, .
 Perry J. & Vanderklein E. L. Water Quality: Management of a Natural Resource, Blackwell Science, Cambridge, Massachusetts  .
 Pickering N. C. 1991, The Bowed String: Observations on the Design, Manufacture, Testing and Performance of Strings for Violins, Violas and Cellos, Amereon, Mattituck, New York.
 Podosek F. A. 2011, "Noble gases", in H. D. Holland & K. K. Turekian (eds), Isotope Geochemistry: From the Treatise on Geochemistry, Elsevier, Amsterdam, pp. 467–492, .
 Podsiki C. 2008, "Heavy metals, their salts, and other compounds", AIC News, November, special insert, pp. 1–4.
 Preschel J. July 29, 2005, "Green bullets not so eco-friendly", CBS News, accessed 18 March 2016.
 Preuss P. 17 July 2011, "What keeps the Earth cooking?," Berkeley Lab, accessed 17 July 2016.
 Prieto C. 2011, The Adventures of a Cello: Revised Edition, with a New Epilogue, University of Texas Press, Austin, 
 Raghuram P., Soma Raju I. V. & Sriramulu J. 2010, "Heavy metals testing in active pharmaceutical ingredients: an alternate approach", Pharmazie, vol. 65, no. 1, pp. 15–18, .
 Rainbow P. S. 1991, "The biology of heavy metals in the sea", in J. Rose (ed.), Water and the Environment, Gordon and Breach Science Publishers, Philadelphia, pp. 415–432, .
 Rand G. M., Wells P. G. & McCarty L. S. 1995, "Introduction to aquatic toxicology", in G. M. Rand (ed.), Fundamentals of Aquatic Toxicology: Effects, Environmental Fate and Risk Assessment, 2nd ed., Taylor & Francis, London, pp. 3–70, .
 Rankin W. J. 2011, Minerals, Metals and Sustainability: Meeting Future Material Needs, CSIRO Publishing, Collingwood, Victoria, .
 Rasic-Milutinovic Z. & Jovanovic D. 2013, "Toxic metals", in M. Ferrante, G. Oliveri Conti, Z. Rasic-Milutinovic & D. Jovanovic (eds), Health Effects of Metals and Related Substances in Drinking Water, IWA Publishing, London, .
 Raymond R. 1984, Out of the Fiery Furnace: The Impact of Metals on the History of Mankind, Macmillan, South Melbourne, .
 Rebhandl W., Milassin A., Brunner L., Steffan I., Benkö T., Hörmann M., Burschen J. 2007, "In vitro study of ingested coins: Leave them or retrieve them?", Journal of Paediatric Surgery, vol. 42, no. 10, pp. 1729–1734, .
 Rehder D. 2010, Chemistry in Space: From Interstellar Matter to the Origin of Life, Wiley-VCH, Weinheim, .
 Renner H., Schlamp G., Kleinwächter I., Drost E., Lüchow H. M., Tews P., Panster P., Diehl M., Lang J., Kreuzer T., Knödler A., Starz K. A., Dermann K., Rothaut J., Drieselmann R., Peter C. & Schiele R. 2012, "Platinum Group Metals and compounds", in F. Ullmann (ed.), Ullmann's Encyclopedia of Industrial Chemistry, vol. 28, Wiley-VCH, Weinheim, pp. 317–388, .
 Reyes J. W. 2007, Environmental Policy as Social Policy? The Impact of Childhood Lead Exposure on Crime, National Bureau of Economic Research Working Paper 13097, accessed 16 October 2016.
 Ridpath I. (ed.) 2012, Oxford Dictionary of Astronomy, 2nd ed. rev., Oxford University Press, New York, .
 Rockhoff H. 2012, America's Economic Way of War: War and the US Economy from the Spanish–American War to the Persian Gulf War, Cambridge University Press, Cambridge, .
 Roe J. & Roe M. 1992, "World's coinage uses 24 chemical elements", World Coinage News, vol. 19, no. 4, pp. 24–25; no. 5, pp. 18–19.
 Russell A. M. & Lee K. L. 2005, Structure–Property Relations in Nonferrous Metals, John Wiley & Sons, Hoboken, New Jersey, .
 Rusyniak D. E., Arroyo A., Acciani J., Froberg B., Kao L. & Furbee B. 2010, "Heavy metal poisoning: Management of intoxication and antidotes", in A. Luch (ed.), Molecular, Clinical and Environmental Toxicology, vol. 2, Birkhäuser Verlag, Basel, pp. 365–396, .
 Ryan J. 2012, Personal Financial Literacy, 2nd ed., South-Western, Mason, Ohio, .
 Samsonov G. V. (ed.) 1968, Handbook of the Physicochemical Properties of the Elements, IFI-Plenum, New York, .
 Sanders R. 2003, "Radioactive potassium may be major heat source in Earth's core," UCBerkelyNews, 10 December, accessed 17 July 20016.
 Schweitzer P. A. 2003, Metallic materials: Physical, Mechanical, and Corrosion properties, Marcel Dekker, New York, .
 Schweitzer G. K. & Pesterfield L. L. 2010, The Aqueous Chemistry of the Elements, Oxford University Press, Oxford, .
 Scott R. M. 1989, Chemical Hazards in the Workplace, CRC Press, Boca Raton, Orlando, .
 Scoullos M. (ed.), Vonkeman G. H., Thornton I. & Makuch Z. 2001, Mercury — Cadmium — Lead Handbook for Sustainable Heavy Metals Policy and Regulation, Kluwer Academic Publishers, Dordrecht, .
 Selinger B. 1978, Chemistry in the Market Place, 2nd ed., Australian National University Press, Canberra, .
 Seymour R. J. & O'Farrelly J. 2012, "Platinum Group Metals", Kirk-Other Encyclopaedia of Chemical Technology, John Wiley & Sons, New York, .
 Shaw B. P., Sahu S. K. & Mishra R. K. 1999, "Heavy metal induced oxidative damage in terrestrial plants", in M. N. V. Prased (ed.), Heavy Metal Stress in Plants: From Biomolecules to Ecosystems Springer-Verlag, Berlin, .
 Shedd K. B. 2002, "Tungsten", Minerals Yearbook, United States Geological Survey.
 Sidgwick N. V. 1950, The Chemical Elements and their Compounds, vol. 1, Oxford University Press, London.
 Silva R. J. 2010, "Fermium, mendelevium, nobelium, and lawrencium", in L. R. Morss, N. Edelstein & J. Fuger (eds), The Chemistry of the Actinide and Transactinide Elements, vol. 3, 4th ed., Springer, Dordrecht, pp. 1621–1651, .
 Spolek G. 2007, "Design and materials in fly fishing", in A. Subic (ed.), Materials in Sports Equipment, Volume 2, Woodhead Publishing, Abington, Cambridge, pp. 225–247, .
 Stankovic S. & Stankocic A. R. 2013, "Bioindicators of toxic metals", in E. Lichtfouse, J. Schwarzbauer, D. Robert 2013, Green materials for energy, products and depollution, Springer, Dordrecht, pp. 151–228.
 State Water Control Resources Board 1987, Toxic substances monitoring program, issue 79, part 20 of the Water Quality Monitoring Report, Sacramento, California.
 Technical Publications 1953, Fire Engineering, vol. 111, p. 235, .
 The Minerals, Metals and Materials Society, Light Metals Division 2016, accessed 22 June 2016.
 The United States Pharmacopeia 1985, 21st revision, The United States Pharmacopeial Convention, Rockville, Maryland, .
 Thorne P. C. L. & Roberts E. R. 1943, Fritz Ephraim Inorganic Chemistry, 4th ed., Gurney and Jackson, London.
 Tisza M. 2001, Physical Metallurgy for Engineers, ASM International, Materials Park, Ohio, .
 Tokar E. J., Boyd W. A., Freedman J. H. & Wales M. P. 2013, "Toxic effects of metals", in C. D. Klaassen (ed.), Casarett and Doull's Toxicology: the Basic Science of Poisons, 8th ed., McGraw-Hill Medical, New York, accessed 9 September 2016 .
 Tomasik P. & Ratajewicz Z. 1985, Pyridine metal complexes, vol. 14, no. 6A, The Chemistry of Heterocyclic Compounds, John Wiley & Sons, New York, .
 Topp N. E. 1965, The Chemistry of the Rare-earth Elements, Elsevier Publishing Company, Amsterdam.
 Torrice M. 2016, "How lead ended up in Flint's tap water," Chemical & Engineering News, vol. 94, no. 7, pp. 26–27.
 Tretkoff E. 2006, "March 20, 1800: Volta describes the Electric Battery", APS News, This Month in Physics History, American Physical Society, accessed 26 August 2016.
 Uden P. C. 2005, 'Speciation of Selenium,' in R. Cornelis, J. Caruso, H. Crews & K. Heumann (eds), Handbook of Elemental Speciation II: Species in the Environment, Food, Medicine and Occupational Health, John Wiley & Sons, Chichester, pp. 346–65, .
 United States Environmental Protection Agency 1988, Ambient Aquatic Life Water Quality Criteria for Antimony (III), draft, Office of Research and Development, Environmental Research Laboratories, Washington.
 United States Environmental Protection Agency 2014, Technical Fact Sheet–Tungsten, accessed 27 March 2016.
 United States Government 2014, Toxic Pollutant List, Code of Federal Regulations, 40 CFR 401.15., accessed 27 March 2016.
 Valkovic V. 1990, "Origin of trace element requirements by living matter", in B. Gruber & J. H. Yopp (eds), Symmetries in Science IV: Biological and biophysical systems, Plenum Press, New York, pp. 213–242, .
 VanGelder K. T. 2014, Fundamentals of Automotive Technology: Principles and Practice, Jones & Bartlett Learning, Burlington MA, .
 Venner M., Lessening M., Pankani D. & Strecker E. 2004, Identification of Research Needs Related to Highway Runoff Management, Transportation Research Board, Washington DC, accessed 21 August 2016.
 Venugopal B. & Luckey T. D. 1978, Metal Toxicity in Mammals, vol. 2, Plenum Press, New York, .
 Vernon R. E. 2013, "Which elements are metalloids", Journal of Chemical Education, vol. 90, no. 12, pp. 1703–1707, .
 Volesky B. 1990, Biosorption of Heavy Metals, CRC Press, Boca Raton, .
 von Gleich A. 2013, "Outlines of a sustainable metals industry", in A. von Gleich, R. U. Ayres & S. Gößling-Reisemann (eds), Sustainable Metals Management, Springer, Dordrecht, pp. 3–40, .
 von Zeerleder A. 1949, Technology of Light Metals, Elsevier Publishing Company, New York.
 Warth A. H. 1956, The Chemistry and Technology of Waxes, Reinhold Publishing Corporation, New York.
 Weart S. R. 1983, "The discovery of nuclear fission and a nuclear physics paradigm", in W. Shea (ed.), Otto Hahn and the Rise of Nuclear Physics, D. Reidel Publishing Company, Dordrecht, pp. 91–133, .
 Weber D. J. & Rutula W. A. 2001, "Use of metals as microbicides in preventing infections in healthcare", in Disinfection, Sterilization, and Preservation, 5th ed., S. S. Block (ed.), Lippincott, Williams & Wilkins, Philadelphia, .
 Welter G. 1976, Cleaning and Preservation of Coins and Medals, S. J. Durst, New York, .
 White C. 2010, Projectile Dynamics in Sport: Principles and Applications, Routledge, London, .
 Wiberg N. 2001, Inorganic Chemistry, Academic Press, San Diego, .
 Wijayawardena M. A. A., Megharaj M. & Naidu R. 2016, "Exposure, toxicity, health impacts and bioavailability of heavy metal mixtures", in D. L. Sparks, Advances in Agronomy, vol. 138, pp. 175–234, Academic Press, London, .
 Wingerson L. 1986, "America cleans up Liberty", New Scientist, 25 December/1 January 1987, pp. 31–35, accessed 1 October 2016.
 Wong M. Y., Hedley G. J., Xie G., Kölln L. S, Samuel I. D. W., Pertegaś A., Bolink H. J., Mosman-Colman, E., "Light-emitting electrochemical cells and solution-processed organic light-emitting diodes using small molecule organic thermally activated delayed fluorescence emitters", Chemistry of Materials, vol. 27, no. 19, pp. 6535–6542, .
 Wulfsberg G. 1987, Principles of Descriptive Inorganic Chemistry, Brooks/Cole Publishing Company, Monterey, California, .
 Wulfsberg G. 2000, Inorganic Chemistry, University Science Books, Sausalito, California, .
 Yadav J. S., Antony A., Subba Reddy, B. V. 2012, "Bismuth(III) salts as synthetic tools in organic transformations", in T. Ollevier (ed.), Bismuth-mediated Organic Reactions, Topics in Current Chemistry 311, Springer, Heidelberg, .
 Yang D. J., Jolly W. L. & O'Keefe A. 1977, "Conversion of hydrous germanium(II) oxide to germynyl sesquioxide, (HGe)2O3", 'Inorganic Chemistry, vol. 16, no. 11, pp.  2980–2982, .
 Yousif N. 2007, Geochemistry of stream sediment from the state of Colorado using NURE data, ETD Collection for the University of Texas, El Paso, paper AAI3273991.

Further reading
Definition and usage
 Ali H. & Khan E. 2017, "What are heavy metals? Long-standing controversy over the scientific use of the term 'heavy metals'—proposal of a comprehensive definition", Toxicological & Environmental Chemistry, pp. 1–25, . Suggests defining heavy metals as "naturally occurring metals having atomic number (Z) greater than 20 and an elemental density greater than 5 g cm−3".
 Duffus J. H. 2002, "Heavy metals'—A meaningless term?", Pure and Applied Chemistry, vol. 74, no. 5, pp. 793–807, . Includes a survey of the term's various meanings.
 Hawkes S. J. 1997, "What is a 'heavy metal'?", Journal of Chemical Education, vol. 74, no. 11, p. 1374, . A chemist's perspective.
 Hübner R., Astin K. B. & Herbert R. J. H. 2010, Heavy metal'—time to move on from semantics to pragmatics?", Journal of Environmental Monitoring, vol. 12, pp. 1511–1514, . Finds that, despite its lack of specificity, the term appears to have become part of the language of science.

Toxicity and biological role
 Baird C. & Cann M. 2012, Environmental Chemistry, 5th ed., chapter 12, "Toxic heavy metals", W. H. Freeman and Company, New York, . Discusses the use, toxicity, and distribution of Hg, Pb, Cd, As, and Cr.
 Nieboer E. & Richardson D. H. S. 1980, "The replacement of the nondescript term 'heavy metals' by a biologically and chemically significant classification of metal ions", Environmental Pollution Series B, Chemical and Physical, vol. 1, no. 1, pp. 3–26, . A widely cited paper, focusing on the biological role of heavy metals.

Formation
 Hadhazy A. 2016, "Galactic 'gold mine' explains the origin of nature's heaviest elements", Science Spotlights, 10 May, accessed 11 July 2016

Uses
 Koehler C. S. W. 2001, "Heavy metal medicine", Chemistry Chronicles, American Chemical Society, accessed 11 July 2016
 Morowitz N. 2006, "The heavy metals", Modern Marvels, season 12, episode 14, HistoryChannel.com
 Öhrström L. 2014, "Tantalum oxide", Chemistry World, 24 September, accessed 4 October 2016. The author explains how tantalum(V) oxide banished brick-sized mobile phones. Also available as a podcast.

External links
 

Metals
Metallic elements
Sets of chemical elements